Alcide-Vital Lataste, OP (5 September 1832 – 10 March 1869) was a French Catholic priest of the Dominican Order. He established the Dominican Sisters of Bethany in 1867 in order to work with women who were abused or from prisons. They aimed to spread the merciful love of Jesus Christ to these women. He assumed the name of Jean-Joseph after he entered the Dominican order.

Pope Benedict XVI approved a healing determined to be a miracle attributed to his intercession and delegated Cardinal Angelo Amato to preside over the beatification in France.

Life
Alcide-Vital Lataste was born on 5 September 1832 in Gironde to his father Vital who lived in the French Revolution and his mother Jeanne. He had two siblings: Rosy and Onorato.

Lataste commenced his studies for the priesthood but grew fearful of such a life and exited. He met Cecilia de Saint-Germain and the two began to date each other. But at the behest of his father he stopped seeing her. The death of his former girlfriend not long after helped to deepen his vocation to consecrated life in the form of the Order of Preachers. He entered the order at the age of 25 and was ordained to the priesthood on 8 1863. He assumed the new name of "Jean-Joseph". It was around the time he entered the order that he decided to become a member of the Saint Vincent de Paul Society.

Following a sermon he delivered in a female prison in Cadillac, Gironde on 14 September 1864 he felt that the Lord called him to establish a religious congregation to cater to the needs of women who left prisons or who were abused. In 1865 he started to formulate ideas in order to begin this mammoth task and he recruited prospective members for this new institution on 14 August 1866. He established the order in 1867. He became aware on 19 March 1866 that the name of Saint Joseph was not included in the mass so he decided to petition Pope Pius IX to do so – the latter did this in 1870.

Lataste died on 10 March 1869 after singing the Salve Regina.

Beatification
The beatification process commenced in Besançon and granted him the posthumous title of Servant of God. The first process spanned from 1937 until 1938 and a second was later held. Both were ratified on 3 April 1992. The Positio – documentation on his life of heroic virtue was submitted in two parts to the Congregation for the Causes of Saints in Rome in 1996 and 1998.

Pope Benedict XVI approved that he lived a virtuous life and proclaimed him to be Venerable on 1 June 2007.

The miracle required for beatification was investigated for two weeks in 1998 and was ratified on 28 October 2005. Benedict XVI approved it on 27 June 2011 thus allowing for his beatification to be celebrated. Cardinal Angelo Amato beatified him on 3 June 2012 on behalf of the pope.

References

External links
Hagiography Circle
Saints SQPN
Dominican Sisters of Bethany

1832 births
1869 deaths
19th-century venerated Christians
Beatifications by Pope Benedict XVI
Founders of Catholic religious communities
French beatified people
Members of the Dominican Order
People from Gironde
Venerated Catholics by Pope Benedict XVI